Illinois elected its new member sometime in 1818, after gaining statehood.

See also 
 1819 United States House of Representatives election in Illinois
 1818 and 1819 United States House of Representatives elections
 List of United States representatives from Illinois

References 

1818
Illinois
United States House of Representatives